The Cobweb may refer to:
 The Cobweb, a novel by William Gibson
 The Cobweb (1955 film), a film starring Richard Widmark, based on the Gibson novel
 The Cobweb (1917 film), a film by Cecil Hepworth
 The Cobweb (novel), a 1996 novel by Neal Stephenson

See also
 Cobweb (disambiguation)